Pterodon was a game developer located in the Czech Republic. Pterodon was founded in 1997 by Jarek Kolář and Michal Janáček. In the year of 2006 they joined Illusion Softworks.

Released games
 Tajemství Oslího ostrova (1994) (PC), an adventure game.
 7 dní a 7 nocí (1994) (PC), an adventure game.
 Hesperian Wars (1998) (PC), a realtime strategy game. A Germany-exclusive title.
 Flying Heroes (2000) (PC), action fantasy game
 Vietcong (2003) (PC), first-person shooter war-game, sold over 1 million copies, thereby is one of the best selling PC games
 Vietcong: Fist Alpha (2004) (PC) (Xbox) (PlayStation 2), first-person shooter war game served as expansion to Vietcong in 2003
 Vietcong 2 (2005) (PC), first-person shooter war-game
Cancelled

 Moscow Rhapsody, first person shooter game.

References

External links
 Pterodon company's website

Video game companies established in 1997
Video game companies disestablished in 2006
Defunct video game companies of the Czech Republic
Video game development companies
Czech companies established in 1997
2006 disestablishments in the Czech Republic